An atmosphere is a gas layer around a celestial body.

Atmosphere may also refer to:

Science
 Atmosphere (unit), a unit of pressure
 Atmosphere of Earth
 Extraterrestrial atmospheres
 Stellar atmosphere

Arts, entertainment, and media

Music

Groups
 Atmosphere (music group), an American hip-hop duo from Minnesota
 Atmosphere (Polish band)

Albums
 Atmosphere (Atmosphere album) (1997)
 Atmosphere (Eloy Fritsch album) (2003)
 Atmosphere (Kaskade album) (2013), or the title song
 Atmosphere (Sevenglory album) (2007)
 Atmosphere, a 1969 album by Colours, produced by Dan Moore and Richard Delvy
 Atmospheres (album) (2014)

Songs and orchestral pieces
 "Atmosphere" (Joy Division song) (1980)
 "Atmosphere" (Kaskade song) (2013)
 "Atmosphere" (1975), from Let's Take It to the Stage by Funkadelic
 "Atmosphere" (1984), by Russ Abbot
 Atmosphères (1961), an orchestral piece by György Ligeti

Periodicals
 Atmosphere (journal), an open access scientific journal
 Atmosphere (magazine), the inflight magazine of Air Transat

Other uses in arts, entertainment, and media
 Atmospheres (TV series)
 Atmospheric theatre, a type of cinema architecture
 Atmosphere, another term for a film extra
 Atmosphere (literature), a literary term referring to the mood surrounding a story
 Atmosphere (service),  a video on-demand service that provides content in a business-to-business capacity

Other uses
 Atmosphere (architecture and spatial design)
 Atmosphere (Kolkata), a residential superstructure in India
 Adobe Atmosphere, a computer graphics platform
 Atmosphere Visual Effects, a Canadian company

See also
 Atmosfear (disambiguation)